Adrian George Rodda  (11 March 1911 – 31 October 1997) was a senior New Zealand civil servant.

He was born in Wellington, and educated at Johnsonville School, Wellington College and Victoria University College.

Rodda's career began in the Inland Revenue Department (New Zealand) in 1928, and he was also in the Housing Construction Division. He was in the first Diploma of Public Administration group in 1940. He joined the Public Service Commission in 1946 as an inspector, and became Chairman of the Commission in 1967. In the 1969 Queen's Birthday Honours, Rodda was appointed a Companion of the Order of St Michael and St George.

Rodda died in Hutt Hospital, aged 86 years.

References

Notable New Zealanders (1979, Paul Hamblyn, Auckland) 
Death Notice Dominion, 1 November 1997 (page 63)  

1911 births
1997 deaths
New Zealand Companions of the Order of St Michael and St George
People educated at Wellington College (New Zealand)
New Zealand public servants
Victoria University of Wellington alumni